Yuriy Shumovskyi was a famous Ukrainian archaeologist and priest. He was born in 1908 in the village of Myrohoshcha, Dubno district, Volhynian Governorate, Russian Empire (now Ukraine).

References

1908 births
1944 deaths
Ukrainian priests
Ukrainian archaeologists
20th-century archaeologists